Matt Davies (born 9 April 1998) is a professional rugby league footballer who plays as a  or  for the London Broncos in the Betfred Championship.

He has spent time on loan from the Broncos at the London Skolars and the Coventry Bears in League 1.

Background
Davies was born in Guildford, Surrey, England.

Career
In 2018 Davies made his professional début for the London Broncos against the Dewsbury Rams in Round 12 of the Championship.

On 5 April 2019 he made his full Super League début for the London Broncos against the Warrington Wolves.

References

External links
London Broncos profile
SL profile

1998 births
Living people
Coventry Bears players
English rugby league players
London Broncos players
London Skolars players
Rugby league hookers
Rugby league halfbacks
Rugby league players from Surrey